Ratae is a village in the municipality of Jegunovce, North Macedonia.

Demographics
According to the 2002 census, the village had a total of 411 inhabitants. Ethnic groups in the village include:

Macedonians 410
Serbs 1

References

Villages in Jegunovce Municipality